Aurelia may refer to:

People
 Version of feminine given name Aurélie
 Aurelia (mother of Caesar)
 Aurelia gens, a Roman family
 Aurelia Browder, American civil rights activist
 Astrud Aurelia, American drag queen

Science
 Aurelia (cnidarian), genus of jellyfishes in the family Ulmaridae
 Aurelia, synonym for chrysalis
 Aurelia (crater), a crater on Venus
 419 Aurelia, an asteroid
 Aurelia, a hypothetical Earth-sized planet orbiting a red dwarf star

Places
 Aurelia, medieval Latin name for Orléans
 Aurelia, Iowa, a small city in the United States

Arts and entertainment
 The title character of Giraudoux's play The Madwoman of Chaillot
 Aurelia (telenovela), a Mexican telenovela
 "Aurelia", a hymn tune for "The Church's One Foundation" by Samuel Sebastian Wesley
 "Aurélia", an 1855 novella by Gérard de Nerval
 "Aurelia", a 1953 single by The Pelicans
 "Aurelia", a track from the 2017 album AFI by AFI

Other uses
 Via Aurelia, an Ancient Roman road leading north-westward from Rome
 Aurelia Finance, Swiss private bank that was a feeder fund to Bernie Madoff
 Lancia Aurelia, an automobile
 USS Aurelia (AKA-23), a US Navy attack cargo ship of World War II
 Aurelia High School, Aurelia, Iowa, United States

See also 
 Orillia, a city in Ontario, Canada, which may have been originally spelled "Aurelia"